Group D of the EuroBasket Women 2019 took place between 27 and 30 June 2019. The group consisted of Serbia, Russia, Belarus and Belgium and played all its games at Zrenjanin, Serbia.

Standings

All times are local (UTC+2).

Matches

Russia vs Belgium

Belarus vs Serbia

Belgium vs Belarus

Serbia vs Russia

Belarus vs Russia

Belgium vs Serbia

References

External links
Official website

Group C
2018–19 in Belarusian basketball
2018–19 in Russian basketball
2018–19 in Belgian basketball
2018–19 in Serbian basketball
Sport in Zrenjanin